The United Kingdom weather records show the most extreme weather ever recorded in the United Kingdom, such as temperature, wind speed, and rainfall records. Reliable temperature records for the whole of the United Kingdom go back to about 1880.

Records
Daily records unless otherwise specified are from 0900-2100 UTC. As of 20 Dec 2022, the records, as recorded by the Met Office, are:

Highest temperature by country

Earlier records for England/UK since 1911 are shown with a * in the "Top 10 hottest days" table below.

Top 10 hottest days

Starred entries signify the then-highest temperature recorded up to that date, until surpassed by the next starred date above.

Lowest temperature by nation

Rainfall

Sunshine

Wind speed

Shetland holds the unofficial British record for wind speed. An earlier gust in 1962 was recorded at 177 mph (285 km/h), both at RAF Saxa Vord. However, it is expected that higher gusts than those reported would have been achieved as during both storms the measuring equipment was destroyed by the extreme weather.

Snowfall

Atmospheric pressure

References

Climate of the United Kingdom
Lists of weather records